Donald Churchill (6 November 193029 October 1991) was an English actor and playwright. He appeared in many film and television productions over a 35-year period and wrote several TV scripts.

Career
His films included Barnacle Bill (1957), The Captain's Table (1959), Victim (1961), The Wild Affair (1964), Zeppelin (1971), The First Great Train Robbery (1978), Charlie Muffin (1979) and The Hound of the Baskervilles (1983) as Doctor Watson. On television he starred in Bulldog Breed (1962), Spooner's Patch (1980-1982), played game show host Ronnie Kemp in Goodnight and God Bless (which Churchill also co-wrote, 1983), Mr Scott Eccles in an adaptation of "The Adventure of Wisteria Lodge" for The Return of Sherlock Holmes in 1988, and appeared in Stanley and the Women (1991) and C.A.T.S. Eyes. His plays include Mixed Feelings, The Decorator, and Moments of Weakness.

Personal life
Churchill married the actress Pauline Yates in 1960; the couple had two daughters, Jemma and Polly.

Death
He died in Spain of a heart attack after filming his final episode of El C.I.D. for Granada Television in which he played the irascible harbour master Metcalf.

Filmography
Barnacle Bill (1957) - Roy
Carve Her Name with Pride (1958) - Roy Bushell (uncredited)
A Night to Remember (1958) - Passenger (uncredited)
The Captain's Table (1959) - Jay
Yesterday's Enemy (1959) - Elliott (uncredited)
Sink the Bismarck! (1960) - Seaman on Ark Royal (uncredited)
Doctor in Love (1960) - Doctor (uncredited)
No Love for Johnnie (1961) - Sheilah's Party Guest (uncredited)
Victim (1961) - Eddy
Spaceflight IC-1 (1965) - Carl Walcott
The Wild Affair (1965) - Andy
Zeppelin (1971) - (uncredited)
The First Great Train Robbery (1979) - Prosecutor
Charlie Muffin (1979) - Wilberforce
The Hound of the Baskervilles (1983) - Dr. John Watson

References

External links

1930 births
1991 deaths
English male film actors
English male television actors
20th-century English male actors